Vaucluse is an unincorporated community in Pleasants County, West Virginia, United States.

The community was named after Vaucluse, in France.

References 

Unincorporated communities in West Virginia
Unincorporated communities in Pleasants County, West Virginia